The Stormont II is a cable ferry operating in the Canadian province of Nova Scotia.

Stormont II was built by Ferguson Industries Ltd. at Pictou in 1980.  It is owned by the Minister of Transportation and Infrastructure Renewal.

Stormont II currently operates on a  route across Country Harbour in Guysborough County where it connects Port Bickerton in the west with Isaac's Harbour North in the east, carrying traffic for Route 211.

References
Nova Scotia Department of Transportation and Infrastructure Renewal - ferries
Transport Canada - Vessel Registration Query System - Stormont II

Ferries of Nova Scotia
Cable ferries in Canada